The British Netminder of the Year award is an annual British ice hockey award made to the best British netminder as voted for by members of Ice Hockey Journalists UK. The award was first made in 1999.

Past winners

See also
Man of Ice Awards

References
Ice Hockey Journalists UK

British ice hockey trophies and awards
Ice hockey goaltender awards
Ice hockey players in the United Kingdom
Awards established in 1999
1999 establishments in the United Kingdom
Annual events in the United Kingdom
Ice Hockey Journalists UK